The Professional Developmental Football League (PDFL) is a minor league American football league that was established in the winter of 2008 and began play in 2009. The league is centered on developing players for the National Football League. Its four current teams are divided into two conferences: the National Development Conference and the American Development Conference. The league's goal is to have ten teams, with five in each conference.

Teams
Seattle-Tacoma Cobras – based in Renton, Washington
Vancouver Blackhawks – based in Vancouver, Washington
Clarksville Warhawks – based in Clarksville, Tennessee
Miami Crush – based in Miami, Florida

References

External links
Official Website

American football leagues
2013 establishments in the United States
Sports leagues established in 2013